Rémi Souyeux (born 19 July 1984) is a French professional footballer who plays as a striker for Championnat National 2 side Romorantin.

External links

1984 births
Living people
Footballers from Toulouse
French footballers
Association football forwards
Balma SC players
Pau FC players
Olympique Alès players
Nîmes Olympique players
ES Troyes AC players
FC Martigues players
Dijon FCO players
Paris FC players
Luzenac AP players
SO Romorantin players
Ligue 2 players
Championnat National players

Championnat National 2 players